Théophile Poilpot (20 March 1848, Paris – 6 February 1915, Paris), also known as Théophile-François-Henri Poilpot, was a French panorama painter.

Biography 
Théophile Poilpot was born and lived all his life in Paris. His father, who shared the same first name, was himself a famous painter. Théophile Poilpot was a student of Gustave Boulanger and Jean-Léon Gérôme at École des Beaux-Arts. Poilpot saw service in the Franco-Prussian War as a Sergeant of the First Volunteer Regiment of the Seine and in 1874 was retired as an officer of the reserves. He was a Mayor of Noisy-le-Grand (1887–1892) and had been an Alderman and a Cantonal Delegate. He was a noted military painter and became a Commandeur of the Legion of Honour in 1913. His paintings are prime examples of academic art of the time, particularly history painting. Among the societies to which he belonged were the Society of French Artists; the Committee of the Association of Artists, Painters, Sculptors, Architects, and Engravers; the Artistic and Literary Association and the Military Circle of the Friends of the Louvre.

Painting career 
Théophile Poilpot did not confine himself to French subjects, and his paintings are located in a number of countries. Several of his best known works are part of collections in the US, including ‘‘Bull Run’’, in Washington, D.C., and the ‘‘Merrimac and Monitor’’. Other major works by Poilpot include the ‘‘Battle of Jena’’, now in Paris, the ‘‘Crowning of Emperor Alexander III’’, in Moscow, the panorama of the ‘‘Battle of Balaklava’’, now in London, the ‘‘Transatlantic Panorama’’, which was shown at the Universal Exposition in 1889, the ‘‘Algerian Panorama’’, shown at the Paris Exposition of 1900, and the famous ‘‘Panorama of the Revolution and the Empire’’, now in Paris.

Awards and honors 
Théophile Poilpot received many honors and decorations, including the Military Medal and the appointment as a Chevalier of the Order of St. Anna of Russia.

Works

Dioramas 
Battle of Nights (1894)
The Paris of the century in 1892

Posters 
Paris, National Library of France

Illustrations 
Reichshoffen's Cuirassiers, historical record by Gustave Toudouze, illustrations by Th. Poilpot, Jacob and Paty.

Exhibitions 
Salon of 1874: A terrible Child 8  
Salon of 1875: The Tarabouk, memory of Algiers 9  
Salon of 1876: The Gallo-Roman Sender and Sleigh 10  
Salon of 1877: Death of Diogenes 11  
Salon of 1878: The Prey 12  
Universal Exhibition of 1889  
Universal Exhibition of 1900

External links 
 Figures contemporaines, tirées de l'album Mariani, 1901, (Bibliothèque nationale de France)
 Bibliothèque nationale de France (gallica.bnf.fr)
 Noisy le Grand, L'ACTUALITÉ
 Nos peintres et sculpteurs, graveurs, dessinateurs. Jules Martin. 1897. p.305
 Revue illustrée (Paris. 1885)
 Célébrités-France-19e siècle-Biographies
 Commandeur of the Legion of Honour since 1913 (gallica.bnf.fr)
 Salon de 1874
 Salon de 1875
 Salon de 1876
 Salon de 1877
 THEOPHILE POILPOT DEAD, The New York Times, February 7, 1915 (pdf)

1848 births
1915 deaths
19th-century French painters
French male painters
20th-century French painters
20th-century French male artists
École des Beaux-Arts alumni
Painters from Paris
French Realist painters
Academic art
Commandeurs of the Légion d'honneur
19th-century painters of historical subjects
19th-century French male artists